Eltony Williams is an American actor, best known for his role as Dr. Randall Holmes in the Oprah Winfrey Network prime time soap opera, If Loving You Is Wrong.

Life and career
Williams was born and raised in Chicago, Illinois. He began acting appearing in two Steppenwolf Theatre Company productions: A Lesson Before Dying in 2003, and Tennessee Williams' One Arm (2004). He later began appearing on television shows, include guest starring roles in Criminal Minds, ER, House, Castle, and NCIS.
 
In 2014, Williams was cast as Dr. Randall Holmes in the Oprah Winfrey Network prime time soap opera, If Loving You Is Wrong. He later had a recurring roles in the ABC prime time soap opera Revenge (2014–15) and the Netflix political drama Designated Survivor (2019).

References

External links

Male actors from Chicago
African-American male actors
21st-century American male actors
American male television actors
American male soap opera actors
Living people
Year of birth missing (living people)